Mehfil (also spelled mahfil) is a formal venue where indoor recreational activities such as poetry (mushaira), singing, music, and dance are entertained in parts of the Indian subcontinent. It is part of Ganga-Jamuni tehzeeb culture. 

Historically, mehfils were presented in the homes or palaces of Muslim royalty or noblemen, who acted as these artists' patrons. Mehfils are also an integral part of the Hyderabadi Muslim community, and used as a way of unity among them, all around the world.

Today they are generally held in the homes of especially avid music lovers or the lovers of poetry-recitation gatherings. Ghazals are a common genre performed at mehfils.  Ghazal recitation gatherings are called 'Mehfil-e-Mushaira' in the Urdu language.

Etymology
The word mehfil derives from the Arabic word mehfil, which means a (festive) "gathering to entertain (or praise someone)."

Mehfil-e-Naat is an Islamic mehfil (forum) in which people sit and recite poetry in the praise of the Prophet Muhammad.

Mehfil-e-Sama is a gathering held for Sufi devotional music such as Qawwali or prayer and chanting, Hadhra, part of Dhikr (remembrance of God).

Popular culture
Several mehfil performances may be seen in the Satyajit Ray film Jalsaghar (1958). In recent times, live onstage concert performances are also called 'Mehfil'. "The word 'Mehfil' generally means a place where a music or dance-performance is in progress."

See also 
Islamic poetry
Urdu poetry
Mawsim
Tweeza

References

External links
Pahenji Mehfil

 Mehfil Official Web
article on Classical Music, Page describing mehfil, author: Deepika Singh, Published 8 May 2000, Retrieved 10 Jan 2017

Indian classical music
Classical music in Pakistan
Hindustani music
Islam in India
Islam in Pakistan
Pakistani culture
Hindustani music terminology
Desi culture